Abgasht-e Madui (also Romanized as Ābgasht-e Madū’ī) is a village in Bakesh-e Yek Rural District, in the Central District of Mamasani County, Fars Province, Iran. At the 2006 census, its population was 464, in 104 families.

References 

Populated places in Mamasani County